Ruthin Union Workhouse was a workhouse on Llanrhydd Street, Ruthin, North Wales.

History
It cost £6,050 at the time and was opened on 4 February 1837. The work house was upgraded in 1910,  on a "square" layout with separate accommodation wings for male or female, infirm or able-bodied etc. The building radiated from a central hub. The Ruthin Union workhouse was demolished in the 1960s: some parts were incorporated into the Ruthin Community Hospital.

References

Ruthin
Workhouses in Wales